Christopher Donlon (born 2 February 1977) is an Australian rules football field umpire currently officiating in the Australian Football League. He has umpired 377 career games in the AFL.

Donlon umpired in the 2011 AFL Grand Final.

During extra time of a 2017 final between the Port Adelaide and the West Coast Eagles, Donlon awarded a controversial free kick to West Coast player Luke Shuey for high contact. Shuey went on to kick the winning goal after the siren. The AFL later clarified they believed it was the correct decision.

Footnotes

External links 

 Chris Donlon at AFL Tables

Australian Football League umpires
Living people
1977 births
Place of birth missing (living people)